Torino Porta Nuova railway station  is the main railway station of Turin, northern Italy. It is the third busiest station in Italy for passenger flow after Rome Termini and Milan Central, with about 192,000 journeys per day and 70 million travellers a year and a total of about 350 trains per day. Porta Nuova is a terminal station, with trains arriving perpendicularly to the facade. The station is located in Corso Vittorio Emanuele II, right in front of Piazza Carlo Felice (in the South side of the city centre).

Trains between Turin and Milan start or finish at the station, including services using the Turin–Milan high-speed line. A metro station, which is part of Turin Metro (Metropolitana di Torino) line 1, has been recently built under the station building.

History
Construction of the station began in 1861 under the direction of Alessandro Mazzucchetti. The original structure included a clear distinction between the departure area (near Via Nizza) and the arrival area (near Via Paolo Sacchi). The departure area consisted of a large saloon, decorated with columns, stucco work and frescoes depicting the crests of 135 Italian cities showing their distance in kilometers from Turin. This building housed the ticket office, three waiting rooms (one for each of the three classes of railway travel), the Royal Hall and a cafe restaurant.

The station was first opened to the public in December 1864 - although the work was completed in 1868. There was no official opening ceremony at the time, partly because the capital of Italy had just been moved from Turin to Florence. An official opening ceremony inaugurating the station was performed on 4 February 2009. The name Porta Nuova ("New Gate" in English) refers to an old city gate once standing nearby, right along the South side of the old city walls, at the bottom of present-day Via Roma (once called Via Nuova): after the walls were torn down at the beginning of the 19th century, the gates themselves got demolished - a singular exception was Porta Palatina - but their old names kept being used as local place names (other examples are Porta Susa and Porta Palazzo).

Enzo Ferrari attended "Bar del Nord" in Porta Nuova, where he met those connected with automobiles and racing when he was working in Turin as a young man, circa 1918–1919.

A station of the Turin Metro (Metropolitana di Torino) named Porta Nuova opened under the main station on 5 October 2007.

Upgrading
The station was included in a nationwide program of upgrades to the main Italian stations, by Grandi Stazioni, a subsidiary of Ferrovie dello Stato. In the first stage of renovations completed on February 4, 2009, 44,146 square metres of the 92,747 square meter area of the station buildings was redeveloped. The areas allocated to services for passengers, dining, shopping, culture and leisure was increased considerably. In January 2013, restoration work continued on the facade and interior, preserving historical elements from the 19th century, including its distinctive, red colour, that hadn't been seen in generations. After nearly 4 years of work, scaffolding came down and the building was unveiled to the public, featuring a new, coloured LED lighting scheme. In December 2016, Unieuro, a large-scale electronics and domestic appliances retailer, opened a 1,400m2 location within the station. Work continues in 2017 on upgrades to the track area, including the addition of more fully accessible platforms.

Structure
The station is built on several levels.  An underground level is occupied by local divisions of FS and businesses.  The platforms are on the ground floor, along with passenger lounges and associated services for passengers and commercial activities. On the upper floors are offices and a post office.

The Gonin Room

In a corridor off the central gallery of the station, a former first-class waiting room where members of the Royal Savoy family awaited their trains, is still visible today. Modest in size, at 75m2, the room is well preserved, featuring original furniture consisting of armchairs, tables, and mirrors. It is not open to the general public, except on special occasions.

The room's name is derived from Francesco Gonin, the artist who painted its frescoes. The paintings, still well maintained, represent the elements of nature - Earth, Water, and Fire. The four corners of the room feature imagery depicting the four continents of Europe, Asia, Africa and the Americas. More impressive is the use of trompe-l'œil effect by Gonin, who wanted to give visitors the impression of a ceiling open to the sky.

Train services
The station is served by the following services:

High speed services (Frecciarossa) Turin – Milan – Bologna – Florence – Rome
High speed services (Frecciarossa) Turin – Milan – Reggio Emilia – Bologna – Florence – Rome – Naples – Salerno
High speed services (Italo) Turin - Milan - Reggio Emilia - Bologna - Florence - Rome - Naples - Salerno
High speed services (Frecciabianca) Turin - Milan - Brescia - Verona - Vicenza - Padua - Venice - Trieste
High speed services (Frecciabianca) Turin - Parma - Bologna - Ancona - Pescara - Foggia - Bari - Brindisi - Lecce
High speed services (Frecciabianca) Turin - Alessandria - Genova - La Spezia - Pisa - Livorno - Rome
Intercity services Turin – Asti – Alessandria – Genoa - La Spezia - Pisa - Livorno - Rome - Naples - Salerno
Intercity services Turin – Asti – Alessandria – Bologna – Rimini – Ancona – Pescara – Foggia – Bari – Brindisi – Lecce
Night train (Intercity Notte) Turin - Alessandria - Bologna - Ancona - Pescara - Foggia - Bari - Brindisi - Lecce
Night train (Intercity Notte) Turin - Genoa - La Spezia - Pisa - Livorno - Rome - Naples - Salerno
Night train (Intercity Notte) Turin - Milan - Parma - Rome - Naples - Salerno
Night train (Intercity Notte) Turin - Milan - Parma - Reggio Emilia - Florence - Rome - Salerno - Lamezia Terme - Reggio di Calabria
Express services (Regionale Veloce) Turin – Chivasso – Santhià – Vercelli – Novara – Milan
Express services (Regionale Veloce) Turin - Chivasso – Ivrea – Aosta
Regional services (Treno regionale) Turin – Asti – Alessandria – Ronco – Genoa
Turin Metropolitan services (SFM3) Bardonecchia - Bussoleno - Turin
Turin Metropolitan services (SFM3) Susa - Bussoleno - Turin

See also
 Turin Metro
 Turin metropolitan railway service
 Torino Porta Susa railway station
 History of rail transport in Italy
 List of railway stations in Piedmont
 Rail transport in Italy
 Railway stations in Italy

References

External links
 Official page at Grandistazioni website
 
 

Porta Nuova
Railway stations opened in 1861
1861 establishments in Italy
Railway stations in Italy opened in the 19th century